HMS Hotspur was a modified  46-gun fifth rate frigate of the Royal Navy. She was built at Pembroke Dockyard and launched on 9 October 1828. She was laid up incomplete at Plymouth in April 1829. In 1859 she was recorded as being a chapel hulk based at HMNB Devonport – possibly moored at Hamoaze.  She was recorded again in 1865, at the same location, as a Roman Catholic chapel hulk. She was renamed HMS Monmouth in 1868, and sold in 1902, after the Roman Catholic Church of Our Most Holy Redeemer was opened in Keyham.

References

 Winfield, Rif & Lyon, David (2004) The Sail and Steam Navy List: All the Ships of the Royal Navy 1815-1889. Chatham Publishing, 2004. .

1828 ships
Seringapatam-class frigate
Ships built in Pembroke Dock